In enzymology, a 6G-fructosyltransferase is an enzyme that catalyzes the chemical reaction

[1-beta-D-fructofuranosyl-(2->1)-]m+1 alpha-D-glucopyranoside + [1-beta-D-fructofuranosyl-(2->1)-]n+1 alpha-D-glucopyranoside  [1-beta-D-fructofuranosyl-(2->1)-]m alpha-D-glucopyranoside + [1-beta-D-fructofuranosyl-(2->1)-]n+1 beta-D-fructofuranosyl-(2->6)-alpha-D-glucopyranoside (m > 0; n > 0)

Thus, the two substrates of this enzyme are [[[1-beta-D-fructofuranosyl-(2->1)-]m+1 alpha-D-glucopyranoside]] and [[[1-beta-D-fructofuranosyl-(2->1)-]n+1 alpha-D-glucopyranoside]], whereas its 4 products are [[[1-beta-D-fructofuranosyl-(2->1)-]m alpha-D-glucopyranoside]], [[[1-beta-D-fructofuranosyl-(2->1)-]n+1]], [[beta-D-fructofuranosyl-(2->6)-alpha-D-glucopyranoside (m > 0; n >=]], and 0.

This enzyme belongs to the family of glycosyltransferases, specifically the hexosyltransferases.  The systematic name of this enzyme class is 1F-oligo[beta-D-fructofuranosyl-(2->1)-]sucrose 6G-beta-D-fructotransferase. Other names in common use include fructan:fructan 6G-fructosyltransferase, 1F(1-beta-D-fructofuranosyl)m, sucrose:1F(1-beta-D-fructofuranosyl)nsucrose, 6G-fructosyltransferase, 6G-FFT, 6G-FT, and 6G-fructotransferase.

References 

 
 
 
 

EC 2.4.1
Enzymes of unknown structure